Spathacanthus is a genus of plants in the family Acanthaceae. It contains the following species (but this list may be incomplete):
 Spathacanthus hahnianus Baill.

Acanthaceae
Acanthaceae genera
Taxa named by Henri Ernest Baillon
Taxonomy articles created by Polbot